This was a new event in 2013. Misa Eguchi and Mari Tanaka won the inaugural title, defeating Tamara Čurović and Wang Yafan in the final, 4–6, 7–5, [10–8].

Seeds

Draw

References 
 Draw

Nature's Way Sydney Tennis International - Women's Doubles
2013 Women's Doubles
Womens dou